is the fourth tokusatsu superhero film adaptation of the popular Kamen Rider Series Kamen Rider Den-O, following Kamen Rider Den-O: I'm Born!, Kamen Rider Den-O & Kiva: Climax Deka, and Saraba Kamen Rider Den-O: Final Countdown. The Onigashima Warship is the first of the films to be part of the Cho-Den-O Series, a new multimedia franchise featuring the characters of Den-O and many new characters. It opened in theaters on May 1, 2009. In its first week in theaters, it opened at #4, after GOEMON at #3, Red Cliff Part II at #2, and Detective Conan: The Raven Chaser at #1. Like its previous film Kamen Rider Den-O & Kiva: Climax Deka, its plot focuses more on Cho Den-O, although the characters of Decade give support to them.

Plot

Taking place after the events of Kamen Rider Decade episode 15, under the impression that they saved the World of Den-O, Tsukasa Kadoya and company begin their journey to the World of Kabuto when they are halted by Sieg who presents them a manuscript that detailed the legendary Oni Conquest with Momotaros' image on it. As this occurred, the Tarōs mysteriously vanish from the DenLiner as they are about to help Kotaro Nogami out with the true threat to their world.

Meanwhile, in the year 1980, a boy named Yu encounters Mimihiko and then Yu is possessed by Deneb who gets him away from the Gelnewts before New Den-O arrives to cover his escape. Seeing Yu reluctant to give them the item, Ryotaro leaves him with a DenLiner admission ticket should he change his mind. The next day, Yu runs off after learns that his father wants him to leave with him. Learning he is hunted by the Gelnewts, Yu tries to outrun the monsters on his bike before managing to reach the sands of time where the DenLiner is waiting for him. Giving them the Trump Stone, Yu wishes to be remain on the train. Though Owner warns him their intent to go back in time to fight the Oni, Yu refuses to turn back. After Yu is informed on the effects the distortions had on Ryotaro and Yuto, the former regressed to a child while the latter has mysteriously disappeared, the DenLiner arrives at the Junction Point where they meet the Station Master who reveals a 1936 newspaper revealing that Urataros, Kintaros, and Ryutaros are making a living as rice thieves in the bodies of another trio named Jiro, Ramon, and Riki (the Arms Monsters of Kamen Rider Kiva). During that time, the kids find Tsukasa who offers his aid. Kotaro is reluctant to accept his help until Tsukasa reveals the scroll Sieg brought with him that has Momotaros on it.

Arriving in the Muromachi period, DenLiner gang arrive and defeat the Gelnewts, meeting Toki and joining her at the village's pleas. Once at Onigashima, New Den-O and the villagers catch the Gelnewts off guard as the kids find Momotaros. Deneb asks Yu to form a contract with him, at least until Yuto returns, to be able to assist the others in. Den-O and Deneb join the fray as Kuchihiko arrives and assumes his Rider form Goludora. During the fight, Toki takes a hit meant for Yu before New Den-O is defeated. Using Kotaro as a bargaining chip, Goludora gives them a day to accept his demands for both the Trump Stone and the DenLiner. The next day, after planning it out, the DenLiner gang gives up both the Trump Stone and the DenLiner. Once the Owner and Naomi are evicted, Kuchihiko ditches Kotaro as he enters the DenLiner to reach his brother in the present time period. However, his journey is staged as the evicted "Owner" is the Station Master in disguise as the real Owner pulled the emergency break as everyone else has erected a massive set designed to look like modern Tokyo. Once the DenLiner staff and the Station Master enter the train, with Kohana guarding the door, Den-O, the Tarōs, and New Den-O battle Goludora and the Gelnewts with Toki providing backup, until she is wounded in battle.

However, Diend appears long enough to summon Kamen Riders Ouja, G3 and Caucasus as wild cards in the fight and Kuchihiko reassembles the Oni's Trump Stone with Mimihiko activating the Demon's Warship in the present and using it to return to the past. The Oni Brothers are able to defeat them until Tsukasa and Sieg arrive, allowing Den-O to assume Wing form as Momotaros possess Tsukasa to fight as Decade. The other Tarōs do the same with Diend's summoned Riders (Urataros with G3, Kintaros with Caucasus and Ryutaros with Ouja) while Deneb enters Kotaro, enabling Kamen Rider New Den-O to assume Vega Form. Helping Toki fire her arrow, Yu manages to break the Demon's Warship's anchor to give the Kamen Riders time to set up a way to end the fight. At Decade's suggestion, Ryotaro forms Kamen Rider Den-O Super Climax Form with the Tarōs and Sieg. Cho-Den-O and Decade manage to overwhelm the Oni Brothers with New Den-O Vega Form and Teddy's aid. After Shilubara sacrifices himself to protect his brother, an enraged Goludora enters the Warship and engages the DenLiner in a battle with Decade taking his leave as the DenLiner gang manages to sink the Warship from the inside out as Kamen Rider Den-O Sword Form finishes Goludora off with a new Rider Kick attack. Soon after, Yu bids farewell to Toki as she is revealed to be his ancestor. Though offered a slight detour before they return to present, Yu turns it down as he wants to be back in his time. After they part ways, Deneb is dropped back in 2009 where he finds Yuto waiting for him, where he reveals that he went by the name Yu as a child and they return to the ZeroLiner.

Pre-production and casting
Initially scheduled to be released in April 2009, Toei later announced that the film would be included in the new Cho-Den-O Series. The first new cast member to be announced was gravure idol Akina Minami. The cast members of Den-O to return include the voice actors of the Tarōs, Sieg, and Deneb, as well as the actors portraying Naomi, Kohana, and Owner, among others (Toshihiko Seki, Kōji Yusa, Masaki Terasoma, Kenichi Suzumura, Shin-ichiro Miki, Hōchū Ōtsuka, Rina Akiyama, Tamaki Matsumoto, Yuichi Nakamura, and Kenjirō Ishimaru). Also to be featured in the film are several cast members of the current Kamen Rider Series Kamen Rider Decade and some of the cast members of Kamen Rider Kiva.

Characters

 Yu is a young boy who, along with his grandmother, encounters the Oni Brothers and then Ryotaro. While his father is on business in foreign countries and his mother dead while he is away, Yu is sent to the countryside to live with his grandmother where he does not make many friends in school. He encounters the Oni Brothers when they come to the countryside to steal the Trump Stone. He joins the DenLiner crew when he forms a contract with Deneb so the Imagin can help fight the Oni Brothers. During the epilogues, it is later revealed that Yu is actually Yuto Sakurai as a child.
 Toki is the protector of the Trump Stone during the Muromachi period, protecting from it the Oni Brothers with her master archery skills. She is the ancestor of Yu's mother.
 Chiyoko is Yu's maternal grandmother and his legal guardian.

Oni Clan
The movie's antagonists are the two brothers of the  based on Onigashima, who both use the  Mirror Monsters as their foot soldiers when they came into their world from the World of Ryuki. They travel through time using the colossal legendary  It is several hundred times larger than the DenLiner, and is armed with torpedoes and harpoons. It is protected by a special barrier so no unwanted visitors can reach the deck. Because of their machinations in the past, they are behind the radical changes occurring to the World of Den-O. Furthermore, the distortions enable them to assume Kamen Rider-like forms.

Goludora
He commands Mimihiko to travel back in time to steal items to further his agenda to control all of time and space by rewriting the legend of Onigashima. But in the end, his plans are ruined by the group effort of the Kamen Riders as he is destroyed by Kamen Rider Den-O as the battleship sinks.

Shilubara
He briefly appears in Kamen Rider Decade in the World of Den-O to acquire the vase for his brother's agenda, getting it while Decade and Den-O are distracted with their fight as New Den-O arrives to stop Shilubara before he took the item back in time. He later travels to 1980 to steal the Trump Stone, but is forced to wait for his brother to acquire it in their time. Once the Trump is complete, Mimihiko pilots the Demon's Warship back into the past where he sacrifices himself to save his brother from Cho-Den-O's attack.

Cast
: 
: 
: 
: 
: 
: 
: 
: 
: 
: 
: 
: 
: 
: 
: 
, : 
: 
: 
: 
: 
: 
Samurais: , 

Voice actors
: 
: 
: 
: 
: 
: 
: 
: , 
, Gelnewt: 
DecaDriver Voice, DienDriver Voice:

Songs
Theme song

Lyrics: Shoko Fujibayashi
Composition & Arrangement: Shuhei Naruse
Artist: : Momotaros (Toshihiko Seki), Urataros (Kōji Yusa), Kintaros (Masaki Terasoma), Ryutaros (Kenichi Suzumura), Teddy (Daisuke Ono), the Owner (Kenjirō Ishimaru), Kotaro Nogami (Dori Sakurada), Naomi (Rina Akiyama), and Kohana (Tamaki Matsumoto)

References

External links
 

2000s Kamen Rider films
Films about time travel
Crossover tokusatsu films
Films directed by Ryuta Tasaki
Films scored by Toshihiko Sahashi